La Asunción is a district of the Belén canton, in the Heredia province of Costa Rica.

Geography 
La Asunción has an area of  km² and an elevation of  metres.

Locations 
 Barrios: Arbolito, Bonanza, Bosques de Doña Rosa, Cariari (part), Chompipes (part), Cristo Rey (part)

Demographics 

For the 2011 census, La Asunción had a population of  inhabitants.

Transportation

Road transportation 
The district is covered by the following road routes:
 National Route 1
 National Route 111

Rail transportation 
The Interurbano Line operated by Incofer goes through this district.

References 

Districts of Heredia Province
Populated places in Heredia Province